The Anti Security Movement (also written as antisec and anti-sec) is a movement opposed to the computer security industry. Antisec is against full disclosure of information relating to software vulnerabilities, exploits, exploitation techniques, hacking tools, attacking public outlets and distribution points of that information. The general thought behind this is that the computer security industry uses full disclosure to profit and develop scare-tactics to convince people into buying their firewalls, anti-virus software and auditing services.

Movement followers have identified as targets of their cause:
websites such as SecurityFocus, SecuriTeam,  Packet Storm, and milw0rm, 
mailing lists like "full-disclosure", "vuln-dev", "vendor-sec" and Bugtraq, and
 public forums and IRC channels.

In 2009, attacks against security communities such as Astalavista and  milw0rm, and the popular image-host ImageShack, have given the movement worldwide media attention.

History
The start of most public attacks in the name of the anti-security movement started around 1999. The "anti-security movement" as it is understood today was coined by the following document which was initially an index on the anti.security.is website.

~el8
~el8 was one of the first anti-security hacktivist groups. The group waged war on the security industry with their popular assault known as "pr0j3kt m4yh3m". pr0j3kt m4yh3m was announced in the second issue of ~el8. The idea of the project was to eliminate all public outlets of security news and exploits. Some of ~el8's more notable targets included Theo de Raadt, K2, Mixter, Ryan Russel (Blue Boar), Gotfault (also known as INSANITY),   Chris McNab (so1o), jobe, pm, aempirei, lcamtuf, and OpenBSD's CVS repository.

The group published four electronic zines which are available on textfiles.com.

pHC
pHC is an acronym for "Phrack High Council". This group also waged war against the security industry and continued to update their website with news, missions, and hack logs.

Less recent history
Most of the original groups such as ~el8 have grown tired of the anti-security movement and left the scene. New groups started to emerge.

dikline
 kept a website which had an index of websites and people attacked by the group or submitted to them. Some of the more notable  targets were rave, rosiello, unl0ck, nocturnal, r0t0r, silent, gotfault, and skew/tal0n.

More recent history

giest
In August 2008, mails were sent through the full-disclosure mailing list from a person/group known as "giest".

Other targets include mwcollect.org in which the group released a tar.gz containing listens of their honeypot networks.

ZF0
ZF0 (Zer0 For Owned) performed numerous attacks in the name of pr0j3kt m4yh3m in 2009. They took targets such as Critical Security, Comodo and various others. They published 5 ezines in total. July 2009, Kevin Mitnick's website was targeted by ZF0, displaying gay pornography with the text "all a board the mantrain."

AntiSec Group
A group known as the "AntiSec Group" enters the scene by attacking groups/communities such as an Astalavista, a security auditing company named SSANZ and the popular image hosting website ImageShack.

Graffiti reading "Antisec" began appearing in San Diego, California in June 2011 and was incorrectly associated with the original Antisec movement. According to CBS8, a local TV affiliate "People living in Mission Beach say the unusual graffiti first appeared last week on the boardwalk." They also reported "...it was quickly painted over, but the stenciled words were back Monday morning." It was later realized to be related to the new Anti-Sec movement started by LulzSec and Anonymous.

On April 30, 2015 the AntiSec Movement reappeared and started Doxing police officers by hacking their databases. On April 30, 2015 they hacked into Madison Police Department and released officers names, address, phone numbers, and other personal data in relation to an Anonymous operation.

References

Hacking (computer security)
Hacker groups
Cyberattacks
Internet-based activism